Turritriton tenuiliratus, common name: the thin-lined triton, is a species of predatory sea snail, a marine gastropod mollusk in the family Cymatiidae.

Description
The shell size varies between 30 mm and 60 mm

Distribution
This species has a wide distribution. It can be found in European waters, the Canary Islands, in the Gulf of Mexico, the Caribbean Sea, the Philippines and Japan.

References

 Gofas S. & Beu A. (2003). Tonnoidean Gastropods of the North Atlantic seamounts and the Azores. American Malacological Bulletin 17(1–2): 91–108
 Rosenberg, G., F. Moretzsohn, and E. F. García. 2009. Gastropoda (Mollusca) of the Gulf of Mexico, Pp. 579–699 in Felder, D.L. and D.K. Camp (eds.), Gulf of Mexico–Origins, Waters, and Biota. Biodiversity. Texas A&M Press, College Station, Texas

External links
 Lischke C.E. (1873). Diagnosen neuer Meeres-Conchylien aus Japan. Malakozoologische Blätter. 21: 19-25
 

Cymatiidae
Gastropods described in 1873